The Kupa is a small river in northern Lithuania and a left tributary of the Lėvuo. At first it flows to north but then near Juodupė town turns to the west. It flows through Kupiškis; the name of the town is derived from name of the river.

References

Rivers of Lithuania